Brigadier Hoshiar Singh OBE, Croix de Guerre, IOM, VSM was the commander of the Indian 62 Brigade stationed at Sela Pass. Brigadier Singh was killed in action, along with a few Indian troops during the 1962 Sino-Indian War. Brigadier Hoshiar Singh was commended for his bravery in the war.

Early life and career
He was born in a Jat family in Village Sankhol, Bahadurgarh, Haryana. The Bahadurgarh City Park metro station has been renamed in his honour to Brigadier Hoshiyar Singh metro station, as announced by Haryana Chief Minister Manohar Lal Khattar, in Sept 2018. He was promoted colonel on 5 July 1962.

Details of the battle 

During the Sino-Indian War in 1962, Hoshiar Singh was in charge of the defence of Sela Pass of this region with a brigade of Indian Army consisting of soldiers from battalions of various regiments, including 1 SIKH, 2 Sikh LI, 4 Sikh LI and also soldiers from Garhwal Rifles.

Death
Singh was killed in action fighting for the Indian Army in the NEFA region in 1962 when his party was ambushed by invading Chinese soldiers while commanding the defence of the Sela Pass.

By the afternoon of 23 November 1962 ( 2 days after ceasefire) Chinese troops belonging to No.2 Company of 154 Regiment (419 Unit) killed brigade commander, three officers and twenty nine other ranks while the rest were wounded or captured at Phudung near Phitang Bridge, southwest of Bomdilla.

Singh's body was preserved in Phudung by the local Monpas. Much later, Indian army officers returned to Phudung and cremated the courageous soldier with his eldest son performing the last rites.

The then Prime Minister Jawaharlal Nehru, Punjab Chief Minister Pratap Kairon along with senior army officers came to village Sankhol to console his family. On the first death anniversary, Indira Gandhi also came to meet his family in the village.

References

Indian Army officers